Kanstantsin Iharavich Barycheuski (born May 29, 1990) is a Belarusian long jumper. Representing his nation Belarus at the 2016 Summer Olympics, Barycheuski registered his best jump at 8.17 m from the 2015 Znamenski Memorial Meet in Meteor Stadium, Zhukovsky.

Barycheuski competed for Belarus in the men's long jump at the 2016 Summer Olympics in Rio de Janeiro. There, he spanned his opening legal jump at 7.39 m, before committing a cautious foul on his second attempt. Heinle extended his third leap to an invincible mark of 7.67 metres, but it was not enough to progress him beyond the qualifying phase, placing him in twenty-third out of thirty-two athletes.

Competition record

References

External links
 

Belarusian male long jumpers
Living people
Place of birth missing (living people)
1990 births
World Athletics Championships athletes for Belarus
Athletes (track and field) at the 2016 Summer Olympics
Olympic athletes of Belarus